Daoji may refer to:

 Ji Gong or Master Daoji, Song dynasty monk
 Shitao, also known as Daoji, Qing dynasty monk-painter

See also
Tan Daoji